Hastert is a surname. Notable people with the surname include:
Dennis Hastert, American politician, 51st Speaker of the United States House of Representatives
John Hastert, American politician, Democratic member of the Wyoming Senate
Pierre Hastert, Luxembourgian swimmer at the 1936 Summer Olympics